The Copa do Brasil is an annual football competitions for clubs in Brazil established in 1989. With the exception of those teams competing in that season's Copa Libertadores, the competition is open to the top teams from Brazil's state leagues, as well as the top ten clubs in the country. Sixty-four teams qualify and compete in a two-legged single elimination tournament that culminates in the finals. The finals is contested over two legs, an away game and a home game.

Thirteen teams have won the competition. Cruzeiro is the most successful team in the history of the competition, having won it six times. Teams from São Paulo state have won the tournament ten times, more than any other state. Only Cruzeiro won the title consecutively in the years 2017 and 2018. In fact, from 2001 to 2012, such a feat was impossible, as teams who won the tournament were not allowed to defend their title on the following year due to scheduling conflicts with the Copa Libertadores. Starting in 2013, the Copa do Brasil was rescheduled so that it be could ran alongside international competitions. Thus, it is now possible for teams to defend their titles.

Key

List of winners

Performance by club

Performance by state

References

External links
Official website 
Official webpage at the Brazilian Football Confederation's website 
Brazil Cup History, RSSSF.com

Winners